Damascus House is a 2016 novel by Corrina Wycoff. It follows several members of a fundamentalist Christian church in the aftermath of a dramatic confession.

Wycoff's previous book, the short story collection O Street, was nominated for a Lambda Literary Award for Lesbian Debut Fiction in 2007.

Plot
Amy Rotolo's announcement to her family that she is a lesbian sets off a series of events which threaten to unravel the tight knit members of Pastor Lou Bianchi's fundamentalist Christian church in Riverview, New Jersey. The resulting drama escalates to irrevocably impact Amy's parents Vic and Linda, her "perfect" childhood friend Rachel, Rachel's husband Alan, Rachel's high school boyfriend Paul, and his wife Lee.

Format and themes
Damascus House is a psychological novel written from the perspective of six different characters. Wycoff told the Puyallup Post, "It's not an indictment against the religious community. It asks how we make sense of faith and circumstance. What does it mean to figure out what to believe when you’ve been told what to believe all of your life?"

Reception
Lydia Netzer described the novel as  "one family’s love story with a faith so painful and confusing the only salvation is to break apart everything." Deb Olin Unferth called it "riveting" and "addictive", adding that "this dazzling book will win you over fast and then splinter your soul." Cris Mazza wrote:

Miriam Gershon praised the author, saying "Wycoff writes with authority, precision and a deep empathy that infuses even the most godless of foibles with humanity." Foreword Reviews described Damascus House as "a knockout as a late-blooming bildungsroman", and called it "an astounding, crisp, and un-ironic portrait of one religious community’s unraveling".

References

2016 American novels
American LGBT novels
Literature by women
Novels with lesbian themes
2010s LGBT novels
Novels set in New Jersey
Novels about religion
2016 LGBT-related literary works